DreamForge Intertainment, Inc. was an American computer game developer.

History
DreamForge was founded as Event Horizon Software, Inc. by the computer game developers Thomas Holmes, Christopher Straka and James Namestka in Greensburg. Until its dissolution the company produced several well-known and awarded computer games, most of them in the genre of role-playing games and strategy video games. After producing several games, the team changed its name to DreamForge Intertainment after learning that its Event Horizon name was shared with a developer of pornographic software.

The company was dissolved in 2001 after struggles with its publishers while working on several titles, including the never finished game Werewolf: The Apocalypse - The Heart of Gaia, as well as Myst IV, with the latter being subsequently continued by a different studio.

List of games
 DarkSpyre
 Dusk of the Gods
 The Summoning
 Dungeon Hack
 Veil of Darkness
 Ravenloft: Strahd's Possession
 Menzoberranzan
 Anvil of Dawn
 Ravenloft: Stone Prophet
 Chronomaster
 War Wind
 War Wind II: Human Onslaught
 101 Dalmatians: Escape from DeVil Manor
 Sanitarium
 TNN Outdoors Pro Hunter
 Warhammer 40,000: Rites of War

Unfinished
 Kehl: Fury Unbound (unfinished Xbox title)
 Myst IV
 Werewolf: The Apocalypse – The Heart of Gaia

References

External links

1990 establishments in Pennsylvania
2001 disestablishments in Pennsylvania
American companies established in 1990
American companies disestablished in 2001
Defunct video game companies of the United States
Game manufacturers
Video game development companies

Video game companies established in 1990
Video game companies disestablished in 2001